Heather MacNeil is a professor at the Faculty of Information of the University of Toronto, Canada. She
teaches archives and record keeping related topics. She is a former General Editor of Archivaria (2014-2015) and helped develop the concept of the Archival bond.

Bill Landis, Head of Public Services, Manuscripts and Archives at Yale University Library, nominated MacNeil's 2005 paper "Picking Our Text: Archival Description, Authenticity, and the Archivist as Editor" as his favourite article from American Archivist, saying "Heather MacNeil does an incredible job of unpacking the hidden assumptions we've developed as a profession ...". In 2016 MacNeil was awarded the James J. Talman Award by the Archives Association of Ontario, which is given to individuals who have "demonstrated an outstanding level of imagination and innovation in contribution to the profession."

Selected publications

References

Further reading
 Millar, Laura. "Heather MacNeil (1954-)" in Encyclopedia of Archival Writers, 1515 - 2015 edited by Luciana Duranti and Patricia C. Franks, London: Rowman and Littlefield, 2019, pp. 366–370. .

External links
 Heather MacNeil Profile at University of Toronto

Year of birth missing (living people)
Living people
Canadian archivists
Female archivists
Canadian women academics
Academic staff of the University of Toronto